Christoph Schaub (born 1958) is a Swiss film director and screenwriter. He has directed fourteen films since 1987. His 2008 film Happy New Year was entered into the 31st Moscow International Film Festival.

Selected filmography
  Sternenberg (2004)
 Happy New Year (2008)
 Amur senza fin (2018)

References

External links

1959 births
Living people
Swiss film directors
Swiss screenwriters
Male screenwriters
Film people from Zürich